Lyutvi Ahmedov (10 April 1930 – 1997) was a Bulgarian wrestler who competed in the 1960 Summer Olympics and in the 1964 Summer Olympics.

References

External links
 

1930 births
1997 deaths
Olympic wrestlers of Bulgaria
Wrestlers at the 1960 Summer Olympics
Wrestlers at the 1964 Summer Olympics
Bulgarian male sport wrestlers
Olympic silver medalists for Bulgaria
Olympic medalists in wrestling
Medalists at the 1964 Summer Olympics
Bulgarian people of Turkish descent
20th-century Bulgarian people
World Wrestling Champions
World Wrestling Championships medalists